Michigan–Ontario League was the name of an American professional baseball league. It operated seven full seasons and part of an eighth from 1919 to 1926.

In 1926, the Michigan–Ontario League merged with the Central League to form the Michigan State League, which played only the one season.

Cities Represented 
Battle Creek, MI: Battle Creek Custers 1919–1920 
Bay City, MI: Bay City Wolves 1919–1926
Brantford, ON: Brantford Red Sox 1919–1921; Brantford Brants 1922 
Flint, MI: Flint Halligans 1919–1920; Flint Vehicles 1921–1926 
Grand Rapids, MI: Grand Rapids Billbobs 1923; Grand Rapids Homoners 1924 
Hamilton, ON: Hamilton Tigers 1919–1923; Hamilton Clippers 1924–1925 
Kalamazoo, MI: Kalamazoo Celery Pickers 1923; Kalamazoo Kazoos 1924 
Kitchener, ON: Kitchener Beavers 1919–1921; Kitchener Terriers 1922; Kitchener Colts 1925 
London, ON: London Tecumsehs 1919–1924; London Indians 1925 
Muskegon, MI: Muskegon Anglers 1923–1924 
Port Huron, MI: Port Huron Saints 1921; Port Huron Saints 1926 
Port Huron, MI & Sarnia, ON: Port Huron-Sarnia Saints 1922 
Saginaw, MI: Saginaw Aces 1919–1926

Standings & statistics

1919 Michigan–Ontario League
 President: Joseph S. Jackson
 No Playoffs Scheduled.

1920 Michigan–Ontario League
 President: George H. Maines 
 No Playoffs Scheduled.

1921 Michigan–Ontario League
 President: George H. Maines 
 Playoff: London 4 games, Bay City 2.

1922 Michigan–Ontario League
President: Thomas J. Halligan
 Playoff: Hamilton 5 games, Saginaw 3.

1923 Michigan–Ontario League
 President: Thomas J. Halligan 
 Playoff: None

1924 Michigan–Ontario League
 President: Thomas J. Halligan 
 Playoff: Bay City 4 games, Flint 3.

1925 Michigan–Ontario League
 President: Thomas J. Halligan
 Playoff: Hamilton 4 games, London 3.

1926 Michigan–Ontario League
 President: Thomas J. Halligan
 Last game played June 13. The league merged with the Central League to form the Michigan State League, which began play June 15.

References

Defunct minor baseball leagues in the United States
Baseball leagues in Michigan
Defunct baseball leagues in Canada